Boxing at the 1956 Summer Olympics took place at the West Melbourne Stadium. A total number of 164 competitors entered from 35 nations, of whom 161 from 34 nations weighed-in and boxing was held eight nights and five afternoons. The boxing schedule began on 23 November and ended on 1 December. Ten boxing events (all men's individual) were contested.

Medal summary

Medal table

References

External links
 United States 1956 Olympic Book, Quadrenniel Report United States Olympic Committee
 Official results
 Amateur Boxing

 
1956
1956 Summer Olympics events
1956 in boxing
International boxing competitions hosted by Australia